Big wheel may refer to:

 Big wheel (tricycle), a low-riding tricycle, usually made of plastic, with an oversized front wheel.
 Michigan logging wheels, also called Big wheels, large wagon wheels used in logging
 A Ferris wheel, commonly called a "big wheel" in the United Kingdom
 Ding Dong snack cakes, also marketed under the brand name "Big Wheel"
 Fisher's Big Wheel, a defunct department store chain based in Pennsylvania
 Big Six wheel, a game of chance often played in casinos
 "Big Wheel", a nickname of baseball player Lance Parrish
 Big Wheel/Rossi, a chain of automotive parts stores acquired by O'Reilly Auto Parts

Music 
"Big Wheels", a song by Electric Light Orchestra from Out of the Blue
Big Wheels (Down with Webster song), a 2011 song by Down with Webster
Big Wheel Recreation, a record label
Big Wheel (Icehouse album), 1993
Big Wheel (Aaron Pritchett album), 2006
Big Wheel (song), a 2007 single by Tori Amos
The Big Wheel (album), a 1991 album by Runrig
"The Big Wheel", a song from the 1991 album Roll the Bones by Rush
Big Wheel, Dutch band featuring Cyril Havermans

Media 
 The Big Wheel (film), a 1949 film starring Mickey Rooney
 Big Wheel (The Price Is Right), a wheel used in the "Showcase Showdown" segment of the television game show The Price Is Right (since 1975)
 Big Wheel (comics) (Jackson Weele), a Marvel Comics supervillain and foe of Spider-Man and Rocket Racer
 "The Big Wheel", the 22nd episode of season 4 in Criminal Minds